This is a list of notable alumni from the University of Richmond, US.

Sports
Bruce Allen – former president, Washington Redskins
Kendall Anthony (born 1993) - basketball player in the Israeli National League
Kenny Atkinson – former head coach, Brooklyn Nets
Shawn Barber – linebacker, Philadelphia Eagles
Tim Bezbatchenko – general manager, Toronto FC (MLS), 2013–present
Joe Biscaha – former NFL and AFL end, 1959–1960
Mike Bragg – NFL player, Washington Redskins 1968–1979, punter
Lew Burdette – former MLB pitcher, 1950–67; Most Valuable Player of the 1957 World Series
Sean Casey – former MLB first baseman, 1997–2008; three-time All-Star
Erik Christensen – former NFL end, 1956
T. J. Cline – American-Israeli professional basketball player
Dick Cooke – college baseball coach at Belmont Abbey and Davidson
 Jonathan de Marte (born 1993) – Israeli-American professional baseball pitcher 
Ray Easterling – former NFL free safety, 1972–1979
Kevin Eastman – assistant coach, Boston Celtics
Ben Edwards – American football player
Reggie Evans – former NFL running back, 1983
Tim Finchem – Commissioner, PGA Tour
Walker Gillette – former NFL wide receiver, 1970–1976
Justin Harper – professional basketball player
Shaun Herock – NFL executive, Green Bay Packers
Tim Hightower – running back, New Orleans Saints
John Hilton – former NFL tight end, 1965–1973
Brian Jordan – former MLB player, 1992–2006
Matt Joyce – former NFL offensive lineman, 1995–2004
George Kokinis – general manager, Cleveland Browns
Kyle Lauletta – quarterback, New York Giants, Philadelphia Eagles, Cleveland Browns
Paris Lenon – linebacker, Arizona Cardinals
Matt Llano – long distance runner
Gregg Marshall – head men's basketball coach, Wichita State University
Renie Martin – former pitcher, Kansas City Royals, San Francisco Giants, and Philadelphia Phillies
Todd McShay – ESPN NFL draft analyst
Marc Megna – former NFL player, 6th round draft pick; New York Jets, 1999; New England Patriots 1999; Cincinnati Bengals 1999; New England Patriots 2000; Montreal Alouettes 2002–2006
Bret Myers (born 1980) - soccer player and professor
Johnny Newman – former NBA player, 1986–2002
Jeff Nixon – former NFL player, 1979–81
Barry Redden – former NFL player, 1st round draft pick; LA Rams, 1982–1990
Jacob Ruby – CFL player Edmonton Eskimos
John Schweitz – former NBA player
Lawrence Sidbury, Jr. – defensive end, Atlanta Falcons
Barty Smith – former NFL running back, Green Bay Packers
Mike Smith – pitcher, Minnesota Twins
Matt Snider (Class of 1999) – former NFL fullback, 1999–2002, Green Bay, Minnesota, Houston
Tim Stauffer – pitcher, San Diego Padres organization; fourth overall pick in the 2003 Major League Baseball Draft
Margaret Stender – President, Chicago Sky
Benjy Taylor – head men's basketball coach, Chicago State University
Brendan Toibin – former NFL kicker, 1987
Stacy Tutt – fullback, New York Jets
Colin Vint – former League of Ireland forward, 2006
Eric Ward – quarterback, Edmonton Eskimos
Seth Williams – cornerback, Montreal Alouettes
Kerry Wynn – defensive end, New York Giants
Craig Ziadie – former Major League Soccer defender, 2001–2004

Politics and government
Watkins Abbitt – U.S. Representative from Virginia, 1948–1973
Ward Armstrong – member, Virginia House of Delegates, 1992–2012
M. Caldwell Butler – U.S. Representative, 1972–1983
Teresa M. Chafin, Justice of the Supreme Court of Virginia
Michael Dunkley – Premier of Bermuda, 2014–2017
Thomas Garrett, Jr. – U.S. Representative, 2017–2019; Virginia State Senator, 2011–2017
J. Vaughan Gary – U.S. Representative, 1945–1965
Virgil Goode – U.S. Representative, 1997–2009
J. Steven Griles – Deputy Secretary for the U.S. Department of the Interior, 2001–2005
Mark Herring - Attorney General of Virginia, 2014–2022
William J. Howell – Speaker, Virginia House of Delegates, 2003–2018
Menalcus Lankford – U.S. Representative, 1929–1933
Jennifer McClellan – member, Virginia House of Delegates, 2006–2017
Andrew Jackson Montague – 44th Governor of Virginia, 1902–1906; U.S. Representative, 1913–1937
Kash Patel — attorney, former chief of staff to the Acting U. S. Secretary of Defense, worked for the U.S. Security Council and U.S. House of Representatives
Owen B. Pickett – U.S. Representative, 1987–2001
Absalom Robertson – U.S. Senator, 1946–1966
Dave E. Satterfield, Jr. – U.S. Representative, 1937–1945
David E. Satterfield III – U.S. Representative, 1965–1981
John Ambler Smith – U.S. Representative, 1873–1875
Michael Stinziano – member of Ohio House of Representatives
Mary Sue Terry – Attorney General of Virginia, 1986–1993
Robert E. Trono – Deputy Director of the United States Marshals Service, 2006–present
Joseph Whitehead – U.S. Representative, 1925–1931
Samuel Grayson Wilson, Judge of the United States District Court for the Western District of Virginia

Business
Leslie M. Baker, Jr. (Class of 1964) – former President and CEO, Wachovia Corporation
 Blair Brandt, Co-Founder and CEO of Next Step Realty
Ting Kwok David Ho – Vancouver entrepreneur
Frank E. Resnik (MS, 1955) – former chairman and CEO, Philip Morris USA
Michael Walrath (Class of 1997) – CEO and Founder of Right Media, Chairman of Yext Inc.

Humanities, arts and media
Josh Abramson – co-founder of CollegeHumor
Steve Buckingham – multiple Grammy-winning record producer and music executive
Kelly Corrigan – author of Glitter and Glue
Paul Duke – journalist, known for his 20-year stint as moderator of Washington Week in Review on PBS
Dave East – rapper, songwriter,actor
Douglas S. Freeman – two-time Pulitzer Prize winning author and historian
Fiona Givens – writer who focuses on the history and theology of the Church of Jesus Christ of Latter-day Saints
Earl Hamner – author of Spencer's Mountain; creator of television shows The Waltons and Falcon Crest
George Frederick Holmes – former professor, first Chancellor of the University of Mississippi
Bruce Hornsby – singer, known for his association with the Grateful Dead; briefly attended UR but did not graduate
Patrick Kilpatrick – actor, known for playing the role of The Sandman in the 1990 film Death Warrant
Lil Dicky – rapper, comedian, and actor
Jamie McShane - actor, known for roles in SEAL Team, Bloodline, Sons of Anarchy, Bosch, and Southland
Allan Nixon – actor and novelist 
Wesley Schultz – lead vocalist for the folk rock band The Lumineers
Grant Shaud – actor, known for playing the role of Miles Silverberg on the 1990s TV sitcom Murphy Brown
Ron Smith (American poet) – poet, author, former Poet Laureate of Virginia (2016–2018)
Ukee Washington – co-anchor with Jessica Kartalija of CBS 3's Eyewitness News at 5, 6 and 11 p.m. and Eyewitness News at 10 p.m. on The CW Philly 57.

Science and technology
 Saul Krugman – scientist; conducted pioneering research on hepatitis B vaccine
 William C. Martin – atomic spectroscopist
 Leland D. Melvin – NASA astronaut
 Alice T. Schafer – former president of Association for Women in Mathematics, namesake of its national prize for undergraduates
 Douglas D. Taylor – entrepreneur and former academic researcher in the field of extracellular vesicles

Education
 Aubrey H. Camden (B.A. 1911) – second President of Hargrave Military Academy (1918–1951)
 Joseph Hathaway Cosby (B.A. 1929) – third President of Hargrave Military Academy (1951–1970)
Claybrook Cottingham (B.A. and M.A., ca. 1902) – President of Louisiana College in Pineville and Louisiana Tech University in Ruston
Mirta Martin (M.B.A. 1992) – ninth president of Fort Hays State University
J. Hillis Miller, Sr. (A.B. 1924) – President of Keuka College (1935–1941); fourth President of the University of Florida (1948–1953)
Bret Myers (born 1980) - soccer player and professor
 T. Ryland Sanford - first President of Hargrave Military Academy (1911–1918)
Brett Wigdortz OBE (B.A. 1995) – CEO & Founder Teach First

Clergy
W. Hersey Davis  professor of New Testament interpretation at Southern Seminary 1920-1948. he authored A Beginner’s Grammar of the Greek New Testament 
Charles Stanley – pastor of the historic First Baptist Church in Atlanta, Georgia, president of InTouch Ministries; past president of the Southern Baptist Convention
Leonard Sweet – author and theologian

References

Richmond